The buff-bridled Inca finch (Incaspiza laeta) is a species of bird traditionally placed in the family Emberizidae, but it may be more closely related to the Thraupidae. It is endemic to Peru where its natural habitats are subtropical or tropical dry forests and subtropical or tropical high-altitude shrubland.

References

Incaspiza
Endemic birds of Peru
Birds described in 1895
Taxa named by Osbert Salvin
Taxonomy articles created by Polbot